The Swedish PGA Championship for men is a golf tournament played annually in Sweden since 1970. It has been an event on the Swedish Golf Tour schedule since 1984 and the Nordic Golf League since 1999.

History
From its beginning in 1970, it was a championship for members of the PGA of Sweden. Since 1986, the tournament has been open to foreign players.

Since 1984, when tournament professionals had been dominating the event for several years, there is also a Swedish PGA Club Pro Championship, limited to club professionals in Sweden, with separate competitions for men, women and senior men categories.

The Swedish PGA Championship for women has been played since 1997.

Winners

See also
Swedish Golf Tour
Nordic Golf League
Swedish PGA Championship (women)
List of sporting events in Sweden

Notes

References

External links
Moregolf Mastercard Tour
PGA of Sweden
Coverage on the Challenge Tour's official site (2005)

Former Challenge Tour events
Swedish Golf Tour events
Golf tournaments in Sweden